DeWayne McBride (born July 8, 2001) is an American football running back. He played college football for the UAB Blazers, where he was named the 2022 Conference USA Offensive Player of the Year after rushing for over 1,700 yards with 19 touchdowns.

High school career 
McBride attended Vanguard High School in Ocala, Florida. As a senior, McBride recorded 936 yards and 12 touchdowns.A three-star recruit, McBride committed to play college football at the University of Alabama at Birmingham.

College career 
As a freshman in 2020, McBride played in six games, tallying 439 yards on 47 carries while scoring four touchdowns. Against Louisiana Tech, McBride ran for a 75-yard touchdown, breaking the record for the longest touchdown rush in school history. McBride entered the 2021 season on the Conference USA preseason all-conference team and on the Doak Walker Award preseason watch list. In 2021, McBride rushed 205 times for 1,371 yards and 13 touchdowns while averaging 6.72 yards per carry and recording over 100 yards rushing six times. McBride rushed for a then career high 210 yards and four touchdowns in a win against Louisiana Tech. At the end of the season, McBride was named to the Second team All-C-USA. Entering the 2022 season, McBride was once again named to the Doak Walker Award preseason watch list while also being named to the Maxwell Award preseason watch list. In 2022, McBride led the NCAA in total rushing yards with 1,713, and led the nation in yards per game (155.7). He also broke the school's record for rushing yards in a game, totaling a career high 272 yards, and rushing touchdowns in a single season with 19. As a result, McBride was named the Conference USA's Offensive Player of the Year. McBride would forgo playing in the 2022 Bahamas Bowl and declared for the 2023 NFL Draft. He played 31 games during his college career, recording 484 rushing attempts for 3,523 yards and 36 touchdowns.

References

External links 
 UAB Blazers bio

2001 births
UAB Blazers football players
American football running backs
Living people
African-American players of American football
Players of American football from Florida